Francisco Massiani (2 April 1944 – 1 April 2019) was a Venezuelan writer and painter. His first novel, Piedra de mar has been a bestseller since its publication. It's a Bildungsroman of a middle class teenager in Caracas. Massiani, won the Municipal Prize of Prose in 1998, and in 2005, the V annual contest of the Fundación para la Cultura Urbana (Foundation for the Urban Culture), for the storybook Florencio y los pajaritos de Angelina, su mujer. In 2006, he published his first book of poetry. In 2012 he won the National Prize for Literature, as a recognition to his entire body of work.

List of works
Novel
 Piedra de mar (1968)
 Los tres mandamientos de Misterdoc Fonegal (1976)
Short Story
 Fiesta de campo/Renate o la vida siempre como en un comienzo (1965; published in 2008)
 Las primeras hojas de la noche (1970) 
 El llanero solitario tiene la cabeza pelada como un cepillo de dientes (1975)
 Relatos (1990)
 Con agua en la piel (1998)
 Florencio y los pajaritos de Angelina, su mujer (2006)

Poetry
2006 Antología
2007 Señor de la ternura
2011 Corsarios
Anthologies
16 cuentos latinoamericanos : antología para jóvenes, Coedición Latinoamericana, 1992,

References

External links
  Fragment Piedra de mar
  "Un regalo para Julia", from Relatos
  En la palabra de Pancho – Interview to Francisco Massiani in Lo afirmativo venezolano

1944 births
2019 deaths
People from Caracas
Venezuelan novelists
Male novelists
21st-century Venezuelan poets
Venezuelan male poets
21st-century male writers
Venezuelan people of Corsican descent